RTÉ Young People's Programming, is a division of Raidió Teilifís Éireann and provides a range of national and international children's programming for RTÉ television, radio and online and also for the independent Irish language broadcaster TG4.

It broadcasts in English and Irish. The division is based at the RTÉ Television Centre in Donnybrook, Dublin. The department covers both Radio, Online and Television output for young people across RTÉ.

Up to 2016 RTÉ's Young People's Programming Department produced and commissioned content. Independent productions consists largely of animations, live action and entertainment programming, while much of the RTÉ's own produced children's content was studio based. In 2016 RTÉ began cutting funding to Young People's Programming, this resulted in RTÉ axing all in-house productions for children, with no increases to funding for independent producers.

Current Programming 
Let's Find Out, science entertainment series
Bush Kids
Wild Atlantic Kids
Storybud (Story time with famous faces) 
X Marks the Spot (Comedy/Drama)
The Imagination Machine
Will Sliney's Storytellers 
Shorts Yule Love (Short animations for the Christmas Season)
Halloween Shorts (Short animations for the Halloween Season)
Marten's Shed
Gamer Mode
Critters TV
Junk Kouture
Ladybird and Bee
Royals Next Door
Squad Gold 
Alva's World (Online safety for pre-schoolers)

2020s

COVID-19 programming
With the introduction of COVID-19 lockdowns in Ireland, RTÉ began broadcasting Home School Hub to help parents and children with home schooling during the period. RTÉ aired the show from 2020 until 2021, it did not return for the autumn schedule in 2021, as lockdowns came to a close. In 2020 the cast of Home School Hub returned for a Christmas special.

Identity 
By 2021 both TRTÉ and RTÉjr websites had been replaced by a new brand RTÉ KIDS, the brand began to be used more and more by the end of the 2021, with TRTÉ largely being dropped save for programming hours on RTÉ2, a continued trend from the late 2010s.

Cost Cutting 
In mid-2016  RTÉ's Two Tube (previously ID and TTV) finished up for its normal season and then moved online for the rest of 2016. In 2016 RTÉ announced that it would move all production to independent producers. In February 2017 RTÉ's Two Tube was cancelled. Under pressure the management team assured the public that RTÉ "is not reducing its commitment to younger people's programmes, nor its spend", however they had already cut funding to children's content by 25%, this was then followed in 2017 with a further cut of 50% bring their total spend on Young People's content to just €3.9 million. In 2018 RTÉ increased funding to €5.8 million but by 2019 had cut it back to €4.7m, this compares to support provided to children's content in 2010 and 2011 of €11m. By 2020 funding for Young People's programming came to €5.5 million.

History

Early history
On 1 January 1926, 2RN started broadcasting. It was Ireland's first radio station. On 24 May 1926, there was the first advertised news bulletin on 2RN.

1940s

In 1946 Radio Éireann was providing 30 minutes per day to children's programming, across music, plays, competitions and talk. In 1948 a series title "Arts Adventures" began broadcasting with Sean Bunny and Marion King

1960s
On 31 December 1961 Ireland's first national television station, Telefís Éireann, was officially launched. A new Television Complex was built at Donnybrook in Dublin.

Dáithí Lacha
Telefís Scoile - 1964 Schools Television, educational programming for secondary school students.

1970s
Wanderly Wagon

1980s
By the end of the 1980s all most all Children's and Young People's content had been moved to RTÉ2, prior to 1988 most of this type of content was dotted around the RTÉ One and RTÉ2 schedules. In 1988 Dempsey's Den/The Den, RTÉ's daily programme for children, moved from RTÉ ONE to RTÉ2 (then known as Network 2), it also moved from 16:00 to 15:00, presenting children's programming for 3 hours per day. It did not air during the summer months until 1998, when it became Den2. The programme was largely known as The Den, with its final season in 2010 when it was replaced by RTÉjr and TRTÉ.

On Network 2 The Den was book ended by the pre-school programming (Bosco) and teen programming (Jo Maxi).  Bosco was produced from 1983 to 1987 and repeat until the arrival of The Morbegs in the 1990s. Jo Maxi ran until the mid-1990s and was replaced in favour of a younger programme called Echo Island.

Saturday morning programming in the 1980s aired on RTÉ ONE from 09:00. The first Saturday Morning children's programme was Anything Goes. In the mid-1980s it was replaced by Pajo's Junkbox, which would later become Pajo's Whole Shebang and Pajo's and the Salty Dog. It was followed by Action Station Saturday, which would be replaced in the 1990s by Scratch Saturday.

Music Television USA was a music video show which aired on Sundays, it was later replaced by The Beatbox, which was replaced in the mid-1990s by 2TV.

Other programming included Fortycoats & Co., a Live Action series, Pat's Chat, an entertainment series with poet Pat Ingoldsby, Eureka, an Irish language quiz show for schools and MegaMix a live music series for up and coming Irish bands.

1990s
Many of the changes made in the late 1980s continued into the mid-1990s, Ian Dempsey left the role of host of Dempsey's Den and he was replaced by Jo Maxi presenter Ray D'Arcy. Jo Maxi continue until the mid-1990s, it was dropped in favour of Echo Island a show aim at the pre-teen market.

RTÉ One continued to be the home of Saturday morning children's TV, with Scratch Saturday which was eventually replaced by The Swamp in the mid-1990s. With this replacement all children's programming moved to RTÉ2/Network2. The Swamp was much more like The Den, providing introductions to TV shows, unlike its interactive predecessors.

In early 1990 many pre-school programmes were added to morning TV on RTÉ ONE, before moving full to RTÉ2 in 1998, where Den2 began broadcasting from 09:00 until 17:30.

Sunday morning video request show The Beat Box was replaced by 2TV in the mid-1990s. 2TV had various spin off programmes, including a short lived daily pre-recorded morning show. Ireland's Top 30 Hits also began broadcasting in the 1990s.

FISH was a short lived Friday Night pop music programme, while T/X took over from The Swamp on Saturday Mornings bring back interviews, competitions and music to Saturday Mornings

The Morbegs took over from Bosco in the mid-1990s.

Live action series included the teen musical comedy Finbar's Class and the BBC co-production Custer's Last Stand-Up.Ray D'Arcy was quiz master on Blackboard Jungle, a secondary schools quiz show, until the end of the 1990s when it was replaced by Gridlock presented by Derek Mooney.

Towards the end of the 1990s Echo Island was replaced by Stream.

2000s
The two children's streams on RTÉ2 (The Den and Den Tots) where joined in 2001 by a similar series for the teen market called ID. Both The Den and Den Tots were made available as separate channels on digital cable, these were purely simulcasts of the RTÉ2 schedule.

ID was renamed twice, it became TTV in the mid-2000s and by the end of the 2000s it was known as Two Tube. It aired from 17:30 to 19:00 each week night, introducing teen programmes such as Sabrina The Teenage Witch, followed by The Simpsons and the Australian soap Home and Away.

During this time there was some attempts to replace music video show 2TV but eventually the idea was dropped. Sattitude was the last RTÉ Saturday morning show along with The Disney Club (later called The Club).

RTÉ during this time had a number of successful animations commissioned from the independent sector.

RTÉ Junior Radio was launched as a stand alone radio station.

2010s
At the beginning of the 2010s the Under 6s strand of programming adopted the name of RTÉ children's Radio station RTÉjr, while its over 6s strand became TRTÉ. While, Two Tube remained as their teen strand until 2016 when it was axed.

In 2011 RTÉjr was given its own channel, initially broadcasting Monday to Friday from 09:00 to 18:00 and later expanding to a 7 day week and starting at 07:00 and closing at 19:00.

In the early 2010s Elev8 was an entertainment show aim at the 6 to 10 age group, while Juice was aimed at the 10 to 14 year old age group.

TRTÉ was gradually scaled back in the late 2010s, its programming having a finish time of 17:30, with the addition of more teen/family programmes such as The Goldbergs, Shortland Street and Neighbours, RTÉ have pushed its end time back to 16:30 each afternoon.

Since the late 2010s the TRTÉ brand is only used on a very small scale. It is used partially on social media, though often referred to as RTÉjr. On screen it is represented by idents and short films about hobbies and interests of children from around the country. Promotionally the programmes aimed at the over 6s use RTÉ2's branding.

By the end of the 2010s Children's content had been significantly reduced due to cut backs.

Programming

Television programmes
RTÉ Young People's Programming include:

English-languageRTÉjrTRTÉNews2dayHome School HubIrish-languageOn TG4Bog Stop''

Radio

RTÉjr

The team

Former Presenters

Ray D'Arcy
Ian Dempsey

Zig and Zag
Dustin the Turkey

References

External links
 RTÉjr website
 TRTÉ website

Radio in the Republic of Ireland
Young